O’Bannon is an Irish surname. Notable people with the name include:

Charles O’Bannon (born 1975), American basketball player
Chuck O'Bannon Jr. (born 1999), American basketball player
Dan O’Bannon (1946-2009), American screenwriter and film director
Ed O’Bannon (born 1972), American basketball player and 1995 NCAA Tournament MOP
Frank O’Bannon (1930–2003), American politician, Governor of Indiana 1997–2003
Helen O’Bannon (1939–1988), American academic and economist
Presley O’Bannon (1776–1850), U.S. Marine Corps officer, famous for his exploits in the First Barbary War
Rockne S. O’Bannon (born 1955), American television writer and producer

See also
Bannon, surname